Bromine pentafluoride, BrF5, is an interhalogen compound and a fluoride of bromine. It is a strong fluorinating agent.

BrF5 finds use in oxygen isotope analysis. Laser ablation of solid silicates in the presence of BrF5 releases O2 for subsequent analysis. It has also been tested as an oxidizer in liquid rocket propellants and is used as a fluorinating agent in the processing of uranium.

Preparation
BrF5 was first prepared in 1931 by the direct reaction of bromine and fluorine.

Br2 + 5 F2 → 2 BrF5

For the preparation of smaller amounts, potassium bromide is used:

KBr + 3 F2 → KF + BrF5

This route yields BrF5 almost completely free of trifluorides and other impurities.

Reactions
BrF5 reacts with water to form bromic acid and hydrofluoric acid:

BrF5 + 3 H2O → HBrO3 + 5 HF

It is an extremely effective fluorinating agent, being able to convert most metals to their highest fluorides even at room temperature. With uranium and uranium compounds, it can be used to produce uranium hexafluoride:

5 U + 6 BrF5 → 5 UF6 + 3 Br2

Hazards
BrF5 reacts violently with water, and is severely corrosive and toxic. Its vapors are also extremely irritating to all parts of the human body, especially the skin, eyes and other mucous membranes. Like many other interhalogen compounds, it will release "smoke" containing acidic vapors if exposed to moist air, which comes from its reaction with the water in the air. Exposure to 100 ppm or more for more than one minute is lethal to most experimental animals. Chronic exposure may cause kidney damage and liver failure.

Additionally, BrF5 is a strong oxidizing agent and may spontaneously ignite or explode upon contact with flammable substances such as organic materials and metal dust.

References

External links
 WebBook page for BrF5

National Pollutant Inventory - Fluoride and compounds fact sheet

Fluorides
Bromine(V) compounds
Interhalogen compounds
Fluorinating agents
Oxidizing agents
Substances discovered in the 1930s